The Improvised Son (French: Le fils improvisé) is a 1932 French comedy film directed by René Guissart and starring Fernand Gravey, Florelle and Saturnin Fabre. The film was produced and distributed by the French subsidiary of Paramount Pictures. It was shot at the Joinville Studios in Paris. It returned modest profits for Paramount, but did not stop the company largely ceasing its production operations at Joinville the following year.

Synopsis
The mistress of a wealthy antiques collector tries to pass off her much younger lover to him as her long-lost son.

Cast
 Fernand Gravey as Fernand Brassart  
 Florelle as Maud  
 Saturnin Fabre as M. Brassart  
 Jackie Monnier as Fanny  
 Edmond Roze as Le baron Brick  
 Louis Baron fils as Léon Le Bélier  
 Christiane Dor as Nöémie  
 Jeanne Blanche 
 Christian Gérard 
 Lucien Brulé 
 Claudie Gesvres

References

Bibliography 
 Crisp, Colin. Genre, Myth and Convention in the French Cinema, 1929-1939. Indiana University Press, 2002.
 Williams, Alan Larson. Republic of Images: A History of French Filmmaking. Harvard University Press, 1992.

External links 
 

1932 films
1932 comedy films
French comedy films
1930s French-language films
Films directed by René Guissart
French black-and-white films
1930s French films
Films shot at Joinville Studios
Paramount Pictures films